McClusky is an unincorporated community in Jersey County, Illinois, United States. It is located along Illinois Route 109, south of Jerseyville.

Notable person
 Larry Chappell - professional baseball player for the Chicago White Sox, Cleveland Indians and Boston Braves

References

Unincorporated communities in Illinois
Unincorporated communities in Jersey County, Illinois